The National Music and Drama Theater of Turkmenistan named after Magtymguly is located on Görogly Street in Ashgabat.

History 
It was created in 2001, on the basis of the Turkmen Opera and Ballet Theater.

The new theater was built in 2004 near Turkmen National Conservatory.

Building 
The theater was built by the Turkish company Polimeks in a classic style, it features a dome and white marble columns on the facade. The project cost US$17 million. The theater hall was designed as a multi-purpose hall with 576 seats, on the ground floor and 224 on the balconies, with a total audience of 800 people.

The stage is on a rotating platform with a diameter of 9 meters on average and an orchestral pit of 55 square meters, which has a lifting organization system. The stage has a total size of 450 square meters and uses a counterweight system with 15 elements to organize theatrical scenery.

Repertoire 
The repertoire of the theater includes the plays of classic and contemporary Turkmen playwrights.

In the theater with tours there are foreign guests.

Notes

External links 
 Building at Polimeks
 Adress
 Scheme

Ashgabat
Opera houses in Turkmenistan
Theatres in Ashgabat
Theatres completed in 2001
2001 establishments in Turkmenistan